= 1965 Liechtenstein family grants referendum =

- 27 June 1965
- Referendum on an initiative to amend the law on family grants

Results
Choice	Votes	%
Yes	1,781	63.36%
No	1,030	36.64%
Valid votes	2,811	95.68%
Invalid or blank votes	127	4.32%
Total votes	2,938	100.00%
Registered voters/turnout	3,824	76.83%

A referendum on family grants was held in Liechtenstein on 27 June 1965. Voters were asked whether they agreed with an initiative to amend the law on the grants. The proposal was approved by 63.4% of voters.

== Results ==
Choice	Votes	%
For	1,781	63.4
Against	1,030	36.6
Invalid/blank votes	127	–
Total	2,938	100
Registered voters/turnout	3,824	76.8
Source: Nohlen & Stöver
